Subliminal Sessions 6 is a compilation album mixed by Euro House DJ/producer Benny Benassi released in 2004. It is the sixth installment in the Subliminal Sessions series, released as a double disc album.

Track listing

Disc 1
 Prase Cats & Andrea Love - "Sing" – 6:36
 Buddha Soul Project - "Brazil in my Mind" – 3:56
 Harrison Crump - "Burning up (Layla)" – 4:01
 Dave Clark - "Way of Life" – 5:57
 Vantage Point - "Can't Get It Wrong" (Motocross Mix) – 6:21
 Benassi Bros. featuring Azibiza - "Turn Me Up" – 6:01
 Inner City - "Big Fun" (Agoria Remix) – 6:48
 Francesco Farfa - "Universal Love" – 6:24
 Evolved vs. OBA - "Afrika (Grounded Deep Mix)" – 6:11
 Neurotic Jock - "Tribal Injection"
 Majestic 12 - "Free Funk"

Disc 2
 Rivera & Williams - "Liar" – 5:57
 Harry Romeo - "Be the One" – 5:58
 Who Da Funk - "Radio" (Alex Fain Dub) – 5:47
 The Crystal Method - "Born Too Slow" – 4:57
 Benny Benassi presents The Biz - "No Matter What You Do" – 5:36
 Bat 67 - "I Want You To Come" – 4:45
 Andrea Bertolini - "Nasty Bass" – 4:22
 Jorge Jaramillo & Sheldon Romero & Alexandra Marin - "House Music Pneumonia" – 5:33
 Shark & Kemu - "Clear Message EP" – 5:10
 Antraig & Pons - "Like this" (Tek Edit) – 5:09
 Thik Dick - "Orgasm" – 8:18

External links
 

DJ mix albums
Benny Benassi albums
2004 compilation albums